The huayco tinamou (Rhynchotus maculicollis), also known as waypu (Quechua) (also spelled guaipo, huaipo, guaypo, waypo, a name which is also applied for other Tinamidae species), is a species of bird found on grassy mountain ridges in the Andes of Bolivia and Argentina.

Taxonomy
All tinamous are from the family Tinamidae, and in the larger scheme are also ratites. Unlike other ratites, tinamous can fly, although in general, they are not strong fliers. All ratites evolved from prehistoric flying birds, and tinamous are the closest living relative of these birds.

Previously, it was considered a subspecies of the red-winged tinamou, but it has a different song, and its head and neck are streaked and spotted black. The SACC split this into a monotypic species and the IUCN followed suit in 2006.

Description
The huayco tinamou has a black streaked and spotted head and neck.

Behavior
Like other tinamous, the huayco tinamou eats fruit off the ground or low-lying bushes. They also eat small amounts of invertebrates, flower buds, tender leaves, seeds, and roots. The male incubates the eggs which may come from different females, and then will raise them until they are ready to be on their own. The nest is located on the ground in dense brush or between raised root buttresses.

Range and habitat
It prefers semi-arid scrub and cereal fields.

Conservation

Footnotes

References
 
 
 
 
 

huayco tinamou
Tinamous of South America
Birds of the Puna grassland
huayco tinamou
huayco tinamou